The Clergy Act 1661 (13 Cha. 2 St. 1. c.2) was an Act of Parliament of the Parliament of England passed in 1661. It "repealed, annulled and made void to all intents and purposes" the Clergy Act 1640, which had prevented those in holy orders from exercising any temporal jurisdiction or authority and so, expelled the bishops, as Lords Spiritual, from the House of Lords. It was itself repealed by the Statute Law Revision Act 1863.

References
The Law & Working of the Constitution: Documents 1660-1914, ed. W. C. Costin & J. Steven Watson. A&C Black, 1952. Vol. I (1660-1783), p. 9
Text of the Clergy Act 1661 at British History Online.

1661 in law
1661 in England
Acts of the Parliament of England concerning religion
Christianity and law in the 17th century
Constitutional laws of England
Acts of the Parliament of the United Kingdom concerning the House of Lords